ZEN (Simplified Chinese: 先; Pinyin: Xiān) was a chain of two Thai luxury department stores owned by the Central Group, with branches in Thailand and China. The final store was re-branded as Central Department Store in 2019.

Overview
ZEN was launched in 1989 as an anchor tenant of the Central World shopping mall in the Pathum Wan District of Bangkok, Thailand.

A second branch was opened in April 2011 in Shenyang, China as part of the Central Group's planned 18 billion baht expansion into the country. It was later closed in 2013.

In 2018, three floors of the Zen Department Store in Bangkok were renovated in the hope of bringing more business to the store.  A new beauty zone was introduced on the first floor.  The fourth and fifth floors, encompassing 11,000 square meters, were remodeled to accommodate 300 new brands and fashion shops.

In 2019, the remaining ZEN location in Bangkok was re-branded, bringing an end to the brand.

Branches

Bangkok Metropolitan Area
 Ratchaprasong (CentralWorld) – rebranded in 2019.

China
 Shenyang – Opened 2011, closed 2013

See also
 Robinson Department Store
 Central Department Store
 The Mall Department Store

References

External links
ZEN Thailand official website

Retail companies established in 1989
Companies based in Bangkok
1989 establishments in Thailand
Thai brands

th:สรรพสินค้าเซ็นทรัล